Svetlana Khokhlova (born 24 February 1971) is a Khazak rugby player.
She participated at the 1994 Women's Rugby World Cup, and the 1998 Women's Rugby World Cup.

References

External links
World Cup 1998 Teams

Living people
Female rugby union players
Kazakhstani rugby union players
1971 births
Place of birth missing (living people)
20th-century Kazakhstani women